The Burkina Faso women's national rugby union team is a national sporting side that represents Burkina Faso in rugby union. They played their first test match against Cameroon in 2021.

History 
Burkina Faso hosted Cameroon for a two-test series in Ouagadougou. They played their first international test on 9 June 2021, and lost 37–0 to the Indomitable Lionesses of Cameroon. They scored their first international points in the second test loss three days later, the score was 35–3.

Burkina Faso competed at the 2022 Rugby Africa Women's Cup in Yaoundé, Cameroon.

Record

Overall

Full internationals

References

African national women's rugby union teams
Rugby union in Burkina Faso